Problepsis albidior is a species of moth of the  family Geometridae. It is found in Asia, including India, Taiwan and Japan.

The wingspan is 36–40 mm.

Subspecies
Problepsis albidior albidior
Problepsis albidior matsumurai Prout 1938 (Japan, Taiwan)

References

Moths described in 1899
Scopulini
Moths of Asia